Malek Jaziri was the defending champion but chose not to defend his title.

Mirza Bašić won the title after defeating Denis Shapovalov 6–4, 6–4 in the final.

Seeds

Draw

Finals

Top half

Bottom half

References
Main Draw
Qualifying Draw

Jalisco Open - Singles
2017 Singles